Kharatsay (Kharasaa) is a rural locality (a selo) in Zakamensky District, Republic of Buryatia, Russia. The population was 390 as of 2010. There are 9 streets.

Geography 
Kharatsay is located 101 km east of Zakamensk (the district's administrative centre) by road. Naryn is the nearest rural locality.

References 

Rural localities in Zakamensky District